The Tha Chin river is a distributary of the Chao Phraya river, Thailand. It splits near the province of Chai Nat and then flows west from the Chao Phraya through the central plains, until it empties into the Gulf of Thailand in Samut Sakhon Province.

Regional names
The Tha Chin river has many regional names. After it splits from Chao Phraya river at Chai Nat, it is called Makham Thao River; while passing Suphan Buri it is the Suphan River; while passing Nakhon Pathom it becomes the Nakhon Chai Si river. Only near its mouth at Samut Sakhon does it become the Tha Chin River, named after the former name of Samut Sakhon. The name Tha Chin is the convention used in most scientific documents.

Tributaries

Tributaries of the Tha Chin include Huai Krasiao, Huai Mae Thawip, Khlong Chorakhe Sam Phan, and Khlong Bang Len.

Tha Chin basin
The Tha Chin Basin is part of the Chao Phraya Watershed.

Past journey
In the past, there used to be passenger boats running back and forth on the Tha Chin River from Suphan Buri to Tha Tian Pier in Bangkok. From time to time, passengers will disembark at Wat Ngiu Rai Railway Station to travel by train to Bangkok. The passenger boat business is owned by the private company Suphan Steam Packet Company.

Later, when land transportation is more prosperous and convenient. Therefore, water transportation is sluggish. The passenger navigation business on the Tha Chin River therefore ceased in the early 1960's.

Health of the river
The Thai Pollution Control Department (PCD) has reported that the water quality of rivers flowing into the upper Gulf of Thailand has seriously deteriorated in the past decade. The department found the Tha Chin estuary contains bacteria and nutrient pollution from phosphates, phosphorus, and nitrogen. Nutrient pollution causes algae to grow faster than ecosystems can handle, harming water quality, food resources for aquatic animals, and marine habitats. It also decreases the oxygen that fish need to survive. PCD rated water quality in the river in 2015 as "poor". The PCD findings indicated large amounts of wastewater were discharged into the river from households, industry, and agriculture.

References

Rivers of Thailand
Chao Phraya River
Gulf of Thailand